Octopoteuthis danae is a little known species of small squid in the genus Octopoteuthis of the family Octopoteuthidae. They belong to the pelagic squid order Oegopsida. It is found in the Atlantic Ocean. It is distinguished from the other known similar Atlantic species, Octopoteuthis megaptera, by having a shorter tail which has two photophores. Its specific name honours James Dwight Dana (1813–1895) the American mineralogist and geologist who was a member of the U.S. Exploring Expedition in the Pacific of 1838–42 under Charles Wilkes. This expedition discovered that Antarctica was a continent and named it.

References

Squid
Molluscs of the Atlantic Ocean
Molluscs described in 1931